Leisure Suit Larry 5: Passionate Patti Does a Little Undercover Work is a graphical adventure game developed and published by Sierra On-Line for the Amiga, DOS and Macintosh computers in 1991. It is the fourth entry in their Leisure Suit Larry series and the first Larry title to have 256-color graphics and a fully icon-based interface. Being an (in)direct sequel to 1989's Leisure Suit Larry 3, its title is misleading, as there is no Leisure Suit Larry 4. The game is followed by Leisure Suit Larry 6 in 1993. It was re-released in 2017 on Steam with Windows support.

Gameplay 
Leisure Suit Larry 5 expands on the multi-character feature of the previous installment, with control periodically passing between the protagonists Larry and Patti. A difference in the interface is that it includes the "Zipper" icon, enabling the character to perform an erotic action.

The overall difficulty is greatly reduced in comparison with past games; neither character can become trapped or die, and losing the game is impossible. Many of the items players collect on their journey are merely optional, only triggering alternative solutions and affecting the final score, but not the game's progress.

Plot 
The absence of a Leisure Suit Larry 4 forms the basis of this newest installment, as Julius Biggs has stolen the "missing floppies" of the game and caused Larry Laffer to become amnesiac. Larry is now in the adult film industry, working for a Mafia-connected company known as PornProdCorp. His boss sends him across the United States to scout for models to appear in "America's Sexiest Home Videos".

Meanwhile, Patti is recruited by the FBI to dig up incriminating evidence on two record companies which are suspected of hiding subliminal messages in their songs. At the same time, PornProdCorp schemes to eliminate the competition in their industry by donating money to CANE (Conservatives Against Nearly Everything).

On his way back to Los Angeles, Larry is involved in an airplane incident, landing the plane safely and being greeted as a hero. He is invited to the White House by George H. W. Bush, where he is reunited with Patti, and Biggs's sinister role is revealed.

Development 
Al Lowe has offered several reasons for the numbering discrepancy in the Leisure Suit Larry games, ranging from a scrapped sequel to an internal office prank. In truth, a multiplayer Leisure Suit Larry game was apparently in the works, designed to be played over Sierra On-Line's burgeoning online service. The project was canceled due to hardware difficulties, inspiring Lowe to skip the "4" title entirely.

Reception 
Al Lowe has said that each game in the Leisure Suit Larry franchise, including Leisure Suit Larry 5, sold over 250,000 copies. According to Sierra, combined sales of the Larry series surpassed 1.4 million units by the end of March 1996, before the release of Leisure Suit Larry: Love for Sail! The total sales of the first five Leisure Suit Larry games had surpassed 2 million copies by the time of Love for Sales launch.

Computer Gaming World called Leisure Suit Larry 5 "a thoroughly enjoyable game".

References

External links 
 
 

1991 video games
Amiga games
DOS games
Classic Mac OS games
Federal Bureau of Investigation in fiction
Leisure Suit Larry games
Point-and-click adventure games
ScummVM-supported games
Sierra Entertainment games
Video game sequels
Video games about amnesia
Video games featuring female protagonists
Video games scored by Al Lowe
Video games set in Los Angeles
Video games set in New York City
Video games set in Miami
Video games set in New Jersey
Windows games
Video games developed in the United States
Single-player video games